Sonbol is a village in Kavir Rural District, Sheshtaraz District, Khalilabad County, Razavi Khorasan Province, Iran. At the 2006 census, its population was 15, in 5 families.

References 

Populated places in Khalilabad County